Yamini (Hindi : यामिनी) is a Hindu/Sanskrit Indian feminine given name, which means "starry night". It also means "Artistic", and "Light in the dark".

Notable people named Yamini 
Yamini Dalal, Indian biochemist
Yamini Krishnamurthy (born 1940), Indian dancer
Yamini Reddy (born 1982), Indian classical dancer, a Kuchipudi exponent

Hindu given names
Indian feminine given names
Sanskrit-language names
Indian given names
Given names
Telugu names